Methanomicrobiaceae are a family of archaea in the order the Methanomicrobiales.

Phylogeny
The currently accepted taxonomy is based on the List of Prokaryotic names with Standing in Nomenclature (LPSN) and National Center for Biotechnology Information (NCBI).

See also
 List of Archaea genera

References

Further reading

Scientific journals
 
 
 
 

Archaea taxonomic families
Euryarchaeota